The Ryefield Bridge is a historic bridge connecting Ryefield Bridge Road in Harrison, Maine, to West Andrew Hill Road in Otisfield, Maine, across the Crooked River.  Built in 1912, it is one of the oldest surviving Warren truss bridges in the state, and is a rare example with double-intersection diagonals, added for increased rigidity.  The bridge was listed on the National Register of Historic Places in 1999.

Description and history
The bridge is set in a rural area of western Maine, set across the Crooked River, which forms the border between the towns of Harrison to the west and Otisfield to the east, in an area known locally as Stuart's Corner. The bridge is a single span,  in length, resting on ashlar granite abutments. It has two Warren through trusses, whose elements are riveted in place, with a second set of diagonal members (the "double intersection" members) that add rigidity to the structure. The portals are adorned with decorative plaques identifying the date and manufacturer of the structure.

The bridge was manufactured by the American Bridge Company and installed in 1912 by its construction arm, the United Construction Company of Albany, New York.  It is one of a handful of known pre-1916 Warren truss bridges in the state, and a particularly rare example of a lighter-weight instance with double-intersection diagonals.  The cost of construction was paid by the towns of Harrison and Otisfield.

See also
National Register of Historic Places listings in Oxford County, Maine
National Register of Historic Places listings in Cumberland County, Maine
List of bridges on the National Register of Historic Places in Maine

References

Road bridges on the National Register of Historic Places in Maine
Bridges completed in 1912
Bridges in Cumberland County, Maine
Bridges in Oxford County, Maine
1912 establishments in Maine
National Register of Historic Places in Cumberland County, Maine
Harrison, Maine
Otisfield, Maine
Steel bridges in the United States
Warren truss bridges in the United States